(Stay with us, for evening falls), 6, is a cantata by Johann Sebastian Bach for use in a Lutheran service. He composed it in Leipzig in 1725 for Easter Monday and first performed it on 2 April 1725.

The prescribed readings for the feast day were Peter's sermon from the Acts of the Apostles, and the Road to Emmaus narration from the Gospel of Luke. The text by an anonymous librettist begins with a line from the gospel, and includes as the third movement two stanzas from Philipp Melanchthon's hymn "" and its second stanza by Nikolaus Selnecker. The text ends with the second stanza of Martin Luther's hymn "". Derived from the gospel scene, the topic is pleading for light in a situation of threatening darkness.

Bach structured the cantata in six movements and scored it for four vocal soloists, a four-part choir and a Baroque instrumental ensemble of oboes, strings and continuo. The extended opening chorus is formed like a French overture and has been compared to Ruht wohl, ihr heiligen Gebeine, the last chorus of Bach's St John Passion.

History and text 
In 1723, Bach was appointed as Thomaskantor (director of church music) in Leipzig, where he was responsible for the music at four churches and for the training and education of boys singing in the Thomanerchor. He took office in the middle of the liturgical year, on the first Sunday after Trinity. In his first twelve months in office, Bach decided to compose new works for almost all liturgical events, known as his first cantata cycle. The year after, he continued that effort, composing chorale cantatas based on Lutheran hymns. He kept the format of the chorale cantata cycle until Palm Sunday of 1725, but then repeated an early Easter cantata, Christ lag in Todes Banden, BWV 4, on Easter Sunday, and wrote Bleib bei uns, denn es will Abend werden for Second Day of Easter as the first cantata in that cycle that was not a chorale cantata. The change was possibly due to the loss of a librettist.

The prescribed readings for the feast day were from the Acts of the Apostles, the sermon of Peter, and from the Gospel of Luke, the Road to Emmaus. Bach used a text by an anonymous poet who had already supplied librettos for his first cycle. The poet took verse 29 from the Gospel of Luke as a starting point: the two disciples ask the stranger whom they met on their way to stay with them, as darkness is about to fall. The situation represents the position of the Christian in general. The librettist chose two stanzas from "" for the third movement, one written by Philipp Melanchthon as a German version of "", and of similar content as the first movement, and the other the hymn's second stanza which was added by Nikolaus Selnecker. The closing chorale is the second stanza of Martin Luther's hymn "" (Maintain us, Lord, within thy word). The text, of rather dry and didactic quality, is focused on the contrast between light and dark, viewing Jesus as the light of a sinful world.

Bach first performed the cantata on 2 April 1725.

Music

Scoring and structure 
Bach structured the cantata in six movements. The first and last are set for choir, while the inner movements are set for soloists, in a sequence of aria – chorale – recitative – aria. Bach scored the work for four vocal soloists (soprano (S), alto (A), tenor (T) and bass (B)), a four-part choir, and a Baroque instrumental ensemble: two oboes (Ob), oboe da caccia (Oc), two violins (Vl), viola (Va), violoncello piccolo (Vp) and basso continuo (Bc). The duration of the piece was stated as 26 minutes by Bach scholar Alfred Dürr but most currently available recordings last about 20 minutes.

In the following table of the movements, the scoring follows the Neue Bach-Ausgabe. The keys and time signatures are taken from Dürr's book about the cantatas, using the symbol for common time (4/4). The instruments are shown separately for winds and strings, while the continuo, playing throughout, is not shown.

Movements

1 
The cantata opens with "" (Abide with us; for it is toward evening), a large-scale tripartite chorus, reminiscent of a slow sarabande or of the closing Ruht wohl, ihr heiligen Gebeine of the St John Passion. The instruments, a choir of three oboes and strings, present a theme which Dürr describes as "of speech-like gestures". It is picked up by the voices, first in homophony. The vocal lines in this movement descend on "" (for evening is nigh) "as if the gloom of night were weighing upon them". While the beginning of the movement has no tempo marking, the middle section is marked Andante and in Alla-breve time, suggesting a faster pace. The voices, accompanied first only by the continuo, perform a fugue on two subjects at the same time: "denn es will Abend werden" (for it is toward evening) and "und der Tag hat sich geneiget" (and the day is far spent). A third motif, long notes on the same pitch, illustrates the "abiding" or staying. The movement is closed by a shortened reprise of the beginning. The Bach scholar Klaus Hofmann compares the slow-fast-slow structure of the movement to the French overture and notes that it opens a new series of cantatas. John Eliot Gardiner, who conducted the Bach Cantata Pilgrimage in 2000, notes the similarity to the last chorus Ruht wohl from Bach's St John Passion, describing the cantata's "tender pleadings which become ever more gestural and urgent for enlightenment in a darkening world from which Jesus' presence has been removed."

2 
The second movement, "" (Highly praised Son of God), is a da capo aria for the alto, accompanied by an obbligato oboe da caccia, which was replaced by viola in later performances. Dürr describes the choice of voice and obbligato in the same range as unusual and "of special charme". The opening phrase is illustrated by an upward line, while the mention of falling darkness is interpreted by downward whole-tone steps.

3 
The third movement, "" (Ah remain with us, Lord Jesus Christ), is a setting of the chorale with a virtuoso part for violincello piccolo. This movement was later adapted as one of the Schübler Chorales, BWV 649.

4 
The only recitative is for bass, "" (The darkness has taken over in many places). Its "threatening chromatic bass line" reminds the listeners of "the gravity of the situation".

5 
The last aria, "" (Jesus, let us look upon You), is for tenor with string accompaniment. It is characterised by a persistent walking rhythm, somewhat mitigated by the flowing triplets in the violin line. Hofmann notes that the lively violin figures illustrate from the start the text about the "light of the Word of God shining more brightly", which appears only in the second part.

6 
The four-part closing chorale, "" (Reveal Your strength, Lord Jesus Christ,), chorale is "quarried very little for musical building blocks", according to Julian Mincham, ending the work on a sombre tone.

Recordings 
The selection is taken from the listing on the Bach Cantatas Website. Instrumental groups playing period instruments in historically informed performances are highlighted green under the header "".

References

External links 
 Bleib bei uns, denn es will Abend werden, BWV 6: performance by the Netherlands Bach Society (video and background information)
 
 BWV 6 Bleib bei uns, denn es will Abend werden: English translation, University of Vermont
 Luke Dahn: BWV 6.6 bach-chorales.com

Church cantatas by Johann Sebastian Bach
1725 compositions
Music for Easter